The People's Action Party of Vietnam is a Vietnamese anti-communist organization in-exile that is based in the United States. The organization's chairman is Nguyen Si Binh and its vice chairman is Dr. Nguyen Xuan Ngai.

Founded in 1991, PAP's goals are to unite the people of Vietnam with a democratic government and reform government programs in education, health care, economy, and human rights.

They established offices in Cambodia, but their officials were arrested and transferred to Vietnam for prosecution. They have actively tried to gain support in Vietnam, but 21 of their supporters were detained by the government without trial for more than two years.

External links

21 members of the People Action's Party are being unlawfully held by the Communist Party
Chairman Nguyen Si Binh arrested in Vietnam Amnesty International
Return to Vietnam lands him in Jail Atlanta Journal
Dr. Ngai Nguyen, detained by Vietnamese authorities during a medical mission in Vietnam Mercury News
Cambodia illegally deported members of (PAP) to Vietnam, Mercuty News
Cambodia Times talking about Cambodia illegally deported members of People Action's Party of Vietnam to Vietnam Cambodian Times
Welcoming Dr. Ngai Nguyen, after a week of being detained by Vietnamese authorities during a medical mission in VN pg. 1

1991 establishments in the United States
Anti-communism in Vietnam
Anti-communist organizations
Banned political parties in Vietnam
Conservatism in Vietnam
Liberal conservative parties
National conservative parties
Nationalist parties in Vietnam
Overseas Vietnamese organizations in the United States
Political parties established in 1991
Social conservative parties
Vietnamese democracy movements